Raúl Araiza (born Raúl Araiza Herrera on 14 November 1964) is a Mexican actor and television presenter.

He studied drama in the Centro de Educación Artística of Televisa.

Filmography

Awards and nominations

References

External links
 

1964 births
Living people
Mexican male telenovela actors
Mexican male television actors
Mexican male film actors
Mexican television presenters
Male actors from Mexico City
20th-century Mexican male actors
21st-century Mexican male actors